The women's javelin throw event at the 1963 Pan American Games was held at the Pacaembu Stadium in São Paulo on 27 April.

Results

References

Athletics at the 1963 Pan American Games
1963